The name Jacob was used to name four tropical cyclones worldwide: one in the Western Pacific and three in the Australian Region.

In the Western Pacific Ocean:
 Tropical Depression Jacob (1999) (03W, Karing) – a system that was considered by Japan Meteorological Agency (JMA) as a tropical depression, despite being analyzed by the Joint Typhoon Warning Center (JTWC) as a tropical storm.

In the Australian Region:
 Cyclone Jacob (1985) – a Category 3 cyclone that paralleled the coast of Western Australia.
 Cyclone Jacob (1996) – the Kimberley and Pilbara coastal areas received heavy rains as the cyclone passed offshore.
 Cyclone Jacob (2007) – made landfall east of Port Hedland, Western Australia.

Pacific typhoon set index articles
Australian region cyclone set index articles